HCCS can refer to:
Houston Community College System
Holmes Chapel Comprehensive School
Heritage Community Christian School (Brockville, Ontario)
HCCS (gene) and Cytochrome c-type heme lyase enzyme.